Callum James Brittain is an English professional footballer who plays as a full-back for Championship club Blackburn Rovers.

Club career

Milton Keynes Dons
Brittain joined Milton Keynes Dons' academy in 2006 aged 8. On 27 April 2016, Brittain signed professional terms with the club ahead of the 2016–17 season.

On 2 May 2016, Brittain joined Icelandic Úrvalsdeild karla side Þróttur Reykjavík on a short-term loan deal until 18 July 2016. In total, Brittain featured 8 times for the club including being named man of the match in several performances. On 28 January 2017, Brittain made his first team league debut for MK Dons, coming on as a late substitute in a 0–4 away win to rivals Peterborough United. On 14 June 2017, Brittain's contract was extended until summer 2018.

On 2 September 2017, Brittain scored his first league goal for the club in a 1–1 draw with Oxford United having come on as a 35th-minute substitute for Ethan Ebanks-Landell. Following his first goal for the club and an international call up, Brittain was named EFL Young Player of the Month for September 2017. In January 2018, Brittain signed a new contract keeping him at the club until June 2020.

Having been released at the expiry of his contract due to the economic situation on 30 June 2020, he re-signed on a two-year deal with Milton Keynes Dons on 25 August 2020.

Barnsley
On 10 October 2020, Brittain joined Championship club Barnsley for an undisclosed fee, signing a three-year contract. In his debut season at Oakwell, Brittain started 40 league games for Barnsley. The club reached the Championship play-offs after finishing in fifth-place in the 2020–21 season. They were knocked out by Swansea City at the semi-final stage of the play-offs. Barnsley were relegated from the Championship in the 2021–22 season.

Blackburn Rovers
On 21 July 2022, Brittain joined Blackburn Rovers for an undisclosed fee on a four-year contract.

International career
On 28 September 2017 following an impressive start to the season, Brittain was called up to the England U20 squad, and went on to provide three assists in fixtures against Italy and Czech Republic. On 15 March 2018, Brittain was called up once again to the squad for fixtures against Poland and Portugal.

Career statistics

Honours
Milton Keynes Dons
EFL League Two third-place promotion: 2018–19

Individual
Milton Keynes Dons Academy Player of the Year: 2015–16
EFL Young Player of the Month: September 2017
Milton Keynes Dons Young Player of the Year: 2017–18

References

External links
England profile at The Football Association

Living people
1998 births
English footballers
Association football defenders
Milton Keynes Dons F.C. players
Knattspyrnufélagið Þróttur players
Barnsley F.C. players
Blackburn Rovers F.C. players
English Football League players
Úrvalsdeild karla (football) players
English expatriate footballers
Expatriate footballers in Iceland
English expatriate sportspeople in Iceland